MITC may refer to:

 Malacca International Trade Centre
 Methyl isothiocyanate
 Seattle Youth Symphony Orchestras
 Media Industry Technologist Certification
 Military Intelligence Training Center